The Minister of Electricity was a minister in the government of New Zealand with responsibility for the New Zealand Electricity Department.

History
The First Labour Government enacted the Electricity Act 1945 which split the hydro-electric branch of the Works Department would be constituted as a separate organisation. Additionally a Minister-in-Charge was to be made responsible for the administration of both the Act and the newly established State Hydro-electric Department. In 1958 the Second Labour Government passed the Electricity Amendment Act which established a dedicated Electricity portfolio as a full cabinet level role, whose minister was responsible for the administration of the Electricity Act and accountability for the New Zealand Electricity Department (superseding the State Hydro-electric Department). In 1978 the Electricity portfolio was abolished and its responsibilities were transferred to the Minister of Energy after the Third National Government passed the Ministry of Energy Act 1977.

List of ministers
The following ministers held the office of Minister of Electricity.

Key

See also
 Electricity in New Zealand

Notes

References

Energy
Electric power in New Zealand